Ratano bin Haji Tuah (born 9 Feb 1976) is a Bruneian retired footballer. He played for Wijaya FC, Brunei M-League representative team, QAF FC, Najip I-Team and IKLS FC as a midfielder.

Ratano was only a youngster at Wijaya FC when he was chosen to play for what was to become Brunei's final season in the Malaysia Premier League in 2004-05. (Its spot was replaced by Brunei DPMM FC from the 2005-06 season onwards.) After the Brunei team disbanded, he was free to pick his domestic league team in which he chose QAF FC. He stayed there for 8 years, winning the Brunei Premier League for three consecutive times. He signed for Najip FC in 2014 and became the captain of renamed Najip I-Team the following season. He signed for IKLS FC in the 2016 season.

International career
Ratano gained 10 caps with the Brunei national football team on three occasions, namely the 2006 AFC Challenge Cup in Bangladesh, the 2007 AFF Championship qualification in the Philippines and the 2010 AFC Challenge Cup qualification held in Sri Lanka. All of the abovementioned tournaments occurred while QAF FC had represented the national team.

Honours
QAF FC
 Brunei Premier League (3): 2005–06, 2007–08, 2009–10
 Brunei League Cup (2): 2008, 2009

References

External links

1976 births
Living people
Association football midfielders
Bruneian footballers
Brunei international footballers
Wijaya FC players
Brunei (Malaysia Premier League team) players